This is a list of covers of Miracles songs that have been recorded and released. According to several websites, the Miracles are one of the most covered groups in recorded history and the most covered Motown group ever. Their music and songs have influenced artists all over the world – in every major musical genre – over the last 50 years.

"(Come 'Round Here) I'm the One You Need"

"(You Can) Depend on Me"

"(You Can't Let the Boy Overpower) The Man in You"

"A Fork in the Road"

"After All"

"Baby, Baby Don't Cry"

"Bad Girl"

"Can You Love a Poor Boy?"
This song, originally recorded by The Miracles, appears on their 1966 album, Away We A Go-Go. It was written by Stevie Wonder

"Choosey Beggar"

"Darling Dear"

"Determination"

"Do It Baby"

"Doggone Right"

"From Head to Toe"

"Going to a Go-Go"

"Got a Job"

"Happy Landing"

"Here I Go Again"

"I Don't Blame You At All"

"I Gotta Dance to Keep From Crying"

"I Like It Like That"

"I Second That Emotion"

"If You Can Want"

"I'll Try Something New"

"I've Been Good to You"

"Love Machine"

"Mickey's Monkey"

"Mighty Good Lovin'"

"More Love"

"My Girl Has Gone"
A Top 20 1965 hit (Top 10 R&B).

"Ooo Baby Baby"

"Oh Be My Love"

"Shop Around"

"The Love I Saw in You Was Just a Mirage"

"The Tears of a Clown"

"The Tracks of My Tears"

"Way Over There"

"We've Come Too Far to End It Now"

"What's So Good About Goodbye"

"Who's Lovin' You"

"You've Really Got a Hold on Me"

List of Miracles songs covered and sampled by other artists
The Miracles, Motown's first group, are the most covered Motown group of all time. Their music and songs have influenced artists all over the world – in every major musical genre – over the last 50 years. Almost all of their hits were self-written, making them unique among Motown acts. Many of the Miracles' songs have been major hits or important recordings for other artists. Among these are:

(This is an incomplete list, as songs by the Miracles continue to be covered by more artists each year)

 "Going to a Go-Go" – The Rolling Stones, Phil Collins, The Hags, and Secret Affair.
 "I Second That Emotion" – Japan, Michael McDonald, Kiki Dee, The Manhattan Transfer, Jerry Garcia, Diana Ross & the Supremes with the Temptations, 10db, Tammy Wynette, José Feliciano, Emilie, Stuck In The Middle, Thelma Jones.
 "(Come 'Round Here) I'm The One You Need " – The Jackson 5, The Cowsills, The GP's
 "If You Can Want" – The Dirtbombs, Barbara McNair, Chazz Dixon.
 "Nowhere To Go- Kanye West (as the basis of his song "About An Angel"), Beanie Sigel (as "Got Nowhere"), Freeway
 "Much Better Off" – J Dilla.
 "You've Got The Love I Need" - J Dilla, Raekwon.
 "A Legend In Its Own Time" – J Dilla (as an exercept of his song "One Eleven").
 "Oh Be My Love"- Barbara Lewis, The Supremes, Barbara McNair.
 "I Don't Blame You At All" - Rosetta Hightower.
 "Mighty Good Lovin"-Edwin Starr, Chris Clark.
 "You're So Fine and Sweet" - The Undertakers.
 "I Like It Like That" - Bobby Vee, Mitch Ryder & the Detroit Wheels.
 "Would I Love You" - Len Barry.
 "Happy Landing" - The Temptations.
 "Special Occasion - Jim Gilstrap.
 "I'll Try Something New" – Diana Ross & the Supremes with the Temptations, Barbara McNair, A Taste of Honey, Spyder Turner (as an excerpt from his cover of "Stand By Me")
 "My Girl Has Gone" – Etienne Daho, Bobby Taylor, Edwyn Collins, Ken Parker.
 "Yester Love" – Gerald Wilson & His Orchestra.
 "The Love I Saw In You Was Just a Mirage" – The Jackson 5, Vance Gilbert, The Uniques
 "Love Machine" – Wham!, Thelma Houston
 "Determination" – The Contours.
 "Choosey Beggar" – Chazz Dixon, Debby Boone.
 "I've Been Good To You" – Marshall Crenshaw, Brenda Holloway, Joe Meek, The Temptones, Ray, Goodman & Brown (The Moments), The Ones, The Temptations.
 "Mickey's Monkey" – Mother's Finest, Martha and the Vandellas, The Supremes, The Hollies, The Young Rascals, John Mellencamp, Lou Christie, Cannibal & the Headhunters, The C.A.Quintet, The Defenders, Chris Catena, The Sugar Beats, The Mac Truque.
 "More Love" – Kim Carnes, Paul Young, Barbara McNair, Mica Paris, The 5th Dimension, Rick Webb, Foster Sylvers.
 "Ooo Baby Baby" – Linda Ronstadt, Brenda Holloway, Shalamar, Ruby Turner, Sylvester, Spirit Traveler, Five Stairsteps, Zapp, Laura Nyro, Ella Fitzgerald, Honey Cone, Human Nature, Fingazz
 "Shop Around" – Captain & Tennille, Don Bryant, The Astronauts, The Allusions, and Georgie Fame, Neil Merryweather and Lynn Carey, among numerous others.
 "The Tears of a Clown" – La Toya Jackson, The Beat, The Rocking Chairs, The Re-Bops, Nnenna Freelon, The Flying Pickets, Caligula, Human Nature, Enuff Z'Nuff, Eumir Deodato, Brian Ray, Marc Cohn, Phil Collins.
 "The Tracks of My Tears " – Linda Ronstadt, Aretha Franklin, Johnny Rivers, Gladys Knight & the Pips, Mongo Santamaría, Martha and the Vandellas, Bryan Ferry, Björns Vänner (as Ser Jag Ut Att Må Bra?), Dolly Parton, Boyz II Men, Human Nature, among many others
 "Darling Dear" – The Jackson 5.
 "Who's Lovin' You" – The Jackson 5, En Vogue, Terence Trent D'Arby, Brenda Holloway, The Supremes, The Temptations, Honey Cone, Stevie B., Archie Bell & the Drells, Nikka Costa.
 "You've Really Got a Hold on Me" – Percy Sledge, Barbara McNair, The Beatles, The Temptations, The Supremes, The Zombies, Aidan Smith, Sonny & Cher, Mickey Gilley, Eddie Money, Cyndi Lauper, The Bobs, Greg Brown, Small Faces, Bobby McFerrin, Derrick Harriott, UFO8, Mike and The Mechanics,  and She & Him among many others.
 "I Gotta Dance to Keep From Crying" – The Who, Jimmy James.
 "From Head to Toe" – Elvis Costello, Chris Clark
 "A Fork in the Road " – Rebbie Jackson
 "Way Over There" – The Royal Counts, The Temptations, Edwin Starr, The Marvelettes, New Man, Eddie Adams Jr.
 "(You Can't Let the Boy Overpower) The Man In You" – Chuck Jackson
 "What's So Good About Goodbye" – Giant Sunflower, The Temptations, Quix*O*Tic
 "More, More, More of Your Love" – Bob Brady & the Con Chords
 "Doggone Right" – Bobby Davis.
 "After All" – The Supremes, The Marvelettes.
 "Swept For You Baby" – The Sylvers, The Blenders, The Tamlins (as Sweat For You Baby).
 "The Hurt is Over" – The DT's
 "Whatever Makes You Happy"- Jacki Gore, Steve Washington.
 "Save Me" – The Undertones
 "(You Can) Depend On Me" – The Temptations, The Supremes, Mary Wells, Brenda Holloway, Barbara Mason.
 "Baby Baby Don't Cry" – Gerald Wilson and His Orchestra, Projekt.
 "Can You Love a Poor Boy" – Bobby Vee, Softones, Gil Bernal, Ronnie Walker.
 "Bad Girl" – Dazz Band, Jackie Jackson, Mary Wells, The Orlons.
 "That's What Love Is Made Of" – Michael Jackson, Bobby Vee, Choker Campbell, The Magicians.
 "We've Come Too Far To End It Now"-The Escorts
 "Here I Go Again" – Chazz Dixon, Carey Bell, A.J. De Bravo, Little Willie G., Oran "Juice" Jones.
 "Point It Out"' – The Supremes and The Temptations.
 "Got A Job" – The Marcels
 "Whole Lotta Shakin' In My Heart (Since I Met You)" – The Hellacopters, Marv Johnson.
 "Give Me Just Another Day" – Young Jeezy (as the basis for his song, "Mr 17.5"), Schoolboy Q, Wade Waters, Christina Milian, Rick Ross, Marco Polo feat. Torae, and others.[63]
 "Do It Baby"- Jimmy Ponder, Red Holt (of Young-Holt Unlimited).
 "Who's Gonna Take The Blame" – Capone N. Noreaga (as the basis of their song "Live On Live Long").
 "Come On Do The Jerk" – The Righteous Brothers [64], The T-Bones 
 "Don't Let It End ('Til You Let It Begin) - Betty Everett,  The Studio Group 
 "I Didn't Realize That The Show Was Over - Epik High (as an excerpt from their song "Encore") 

References: Allmusic, The Covers Project, Second Hand Songs, "Who Sampled" website.

See also
The Miracles
The Miracles discography

Notes

Covers
Miracles